Hess Glacier is a glacier  long, flowing east-northeast between steep rock walls to its terminus  southwest of Monnier Point, on the east coast of Graham Land, Antarctica. It was charted in 1947 by the Falkland Islands Dependencies Survey, who named it for Hans Hess, a German glaciologist.

References

Glaciers of Graham Land
Foyn Coast